The Davidson–Smitherman House, also known as the Davidson Plantation, is a historic plantation house in Centreville in Bibb County, Alabama.   It was added to the National Register of Historic Places on January 6, 1988.

History
The house was built in 1837 for Samuel Wilson Davidson, a native of North Carolina. He settled in Bibb County (then Cahaba County) in 1819. He was one of the first people to purchase lots along the east bank of the Cahaba River in what would become the city of Centreville during 1823. His real estate was valued at $12,000 and he owned 98 slaves in 1850. By 1860, Davidson was the most extensive planter and wealthiest citizen in the area. He died in 1863.

The house remained in the Davidson family until 1869, when it was purchased by Thomas and Betty Smitherman.  Thomas Smitherman was a prominent local attorney.  Smitherman descendants retained the property until it was sold to William E. Henderson in 1963.  He, in turn, sold it after two years to Charles L. Hollinsworth, who sold it to Gladys Pittman Leggett in 1972.

Architecture
The -story Federal style house is notable as one of the only two best antebellum houses remaining in the county and as one of the two earliest and least altered houses built in Centreville by the city's leading builders, George Howard and Enoch Carson.  The wood-frame structure is set over a full brick basement.  The front and rear both feature three bay facades, inset with 12 over 12 sash windows downstairs and 12 over 8 windows upstairs.  The front facade features a full-width two-tiered porch with decorative brackets, while the rear features a one-story porch with brackets matching those on the front.  The interior is arranged on a center hall plan, with a reverse flight stairway.  The house has Federal style mantles and wainscoting, with heart pine floors throughout.

References

National Register of Historic Places in Bibb County, Alabama
Houses in Bibb County, Alabama
Houses on the National Register of Historic Places in Alabama
Federal architecture in Alabama
Plantation houses in Alabama
Houses completed in 1837